The W. M. Keck Observatory is an astronomical observatory with two telescopes at an elevation of 4,145 meters (13,600 ft) near the summit of Mauna Kea in the U.S. state of Hawaii. Both telescopes have  aperture primary mirrors, and when completed in 1993 (Keck 1) and 1996 (Keck 2) were the largest astronomical telescopes in the world.  They are currently the 3rd and 4th largest.

Overview 
With a concept first proposed in 1977, telescope designers at the University of California, Berkeley (Terry Mast) and Lawrence Berkeley Laboratory (Jerry Nelson) had been developing the technology necessary to build a large, ground-based telescope. With a design in hand, a search for the funding began. In 1985, Howard B. Keck of the W. M. Keck Foundation gave $70 million to fund the construction of the Keck I telescope, which began in September 1985, with first light occurring on November 24, 1990, using nine of the eventual 36 segments. With construction of the first telescope well advanced, further donations allowed the construction of a second telescope starting in 1991. The Keck I telescope began science observations in May 1993, while first light for Keck II occurred on October 23, 1996.

The key advance that allowed the construction of the Keck telescopes was the use of active optics to operate smaller mirror segments as a single, contiguous mirror. A mirror of similar size cast of a single piece of glass could not be made rigid enough to hold its shape precisely; it would sag microscopically under its own weight as it was turned to different positions, causing aberrations in the optical path. In the Keck telescopes, each primary mirror is made of 36 hexagonal segments that work together as a unit. Each segment is 1.8 meters wide, 7.5 centimeters thick, and weighs half a ton. The mirrors were made from Zerodur glass-ceramic by the German company Schott AG. On the telescope, each segment is kept stable by a system of active optics, which uses extremely rigid support structures in combination with three actuators under each segment. During observation, the computer-controlled system of sensors and actuators dynamically adjusts each segment's position relative to its neighbors, keeping a surface shape accuracy of four nanometers. As the telescope moves, this twice-per-second adjustment counters the effects of gravity and other environmental and structural effects that can affect mirror shape.

Each Keck telescope sits on an altazimuth mount. Most current 8–10 m class telescopes use altazimuth designs due to their reduced structural requirements compared to older equatorial designs. Altazimuth mounting provides the greatest strength and stiffness with the least amount of steel, which, for Keck Observatory, totals about 270 tons per telescope, bringing each telescope's total weight to more than 300 tons. Two proposed designs for the next generation 30 and 40 m telescopes use the same basic technology pioneered at Keck Observatory: a hexagonal mirror array coupled with an altazimuth mounting.

Each of the two telescopes has a primary mirror of 10 meters (32.8 ft or 394 in), slightly smaller than the Gran Telescopio Canarias. However, all of the light collected by the Keck primary mirrors (75.76 m2) is sent to the secondary mirror and instruments, compared to GTC's primary mirror, which has an effective light-collection area of 73.4 m2, or  less than each of the Keck primary mirrors. Because of this fundamental design difference, the Keck telescopes arguably remain the largest steerable, optical/infrared telescopes on Earth.

The telescopes are equipped with a suite of cameras and spectrometers that allow observations across much of the visible and near-infrared spectrum.

Management 

The Keck Observatory is managed by the California Association for Research in Astronomy, a non-profit 501(c)(3) organization whose board of directors includes representatives from Caltech and the University of California. Construction of the telescopes was made possible through private grants of over $140 million from the W.M. Keck Foundation. The National Aeronautics and Space Administration (NASA) joined the partnership in October 1996 when Keck II commenced observations.

Telescope time is allocated by the partner institutions. Caltech, the University of Hawaii System, and the University of California accept proposals from their own researchers; NASA accepts proposals from researchers based in the United States.

Jerry Nelson, Keck Telescope project scientist, contributed to later multi-mirror projects until his death in June 2017. He conceived one of the Kecks's innovations: a reflecting surface of multiple thin segments acting as one mirror.

Instruments 

 MOSFIRE  MOSFIRE (Multi-Object Spectrometer for Infra-Red Exploration), a third-generation instrument, was delivered to Keck Observatory on February 8, 2012; first light was obtained on the Kecks I telescope on April 4, 2012. A multi-object spectrograph wide-field camera for the near-infrared (0.97 to 2.41 μm), its special feature is its cryogenic Configurable Slit Unit (CSU) that is reconfigurable by remote control in under six minutes without any thermal cycling. Bars move in from each side to form up to 46 short slits. When the bars are removed, MOSFIRE becomes a wide-field imager. It was developed by teams from the University of California, Los Angeles (UCLA), the California Institute of Technology (Caltech) and the University of California, Santa Cruz, (UCSC). Its co-principal investigators are Ian S. McLean (UCLA) and Charles C. Steidel (Caltech), and the project was managed by WMKO Instrument Program Manager Sean Adkins. MOSFIRE was funded in part by the Telescope System Instrumentation Program (TSIP), operated by AURA and funded by the National Science Foundation; and by a private donation to WMKO by Gordon and Betty Moore.
 DEIMOS  The Deep Extragalactic Imaging Multi-Object Spectrograph is capable of gathering spectra from 130 galaxies or more in a single exposure. In "Mega Mask" mode, DEIMOS can take spectra of more than 1,200 objects at once, using a special narrow-band filter.
 HIRES  The largest and most mechanically complex of the Keck Observatory's main instruments, the High Resolution Echelle Spectrometer breaks up incoming light into its component colors to measure the precise intensity of each of thousands of color channels. Its spectral capabilities have resulted in many breakthrough discoveries, such as the detection of planets outside our solar system and direct evidence for a model of the Big Bang theory. The radial velocity precision is up to one meter per second (1.0 m/s).
 KCWI  The Keck Cosmic Web Imager is an integral field spectrograph operating at wavelengths between 350 and 560 nm.
 LRIS  The Low Resolution Imaging Spectrograph is a faint-light instrument capable of taking spectra and images of the most distant known objects in the universe. The instrument is equipped with a red arm and a blue arm to explore stellar populations of distant galaxies, active galactic nuclei, galactic clusters, and quasars.
 LWS The Long Wavelength Spectrometer for the Keck I telescope is and imaging, grating spectrometer working in the wavelength range of 3-25 microns. Like NIRC, the LWS was a forward-CASS instrument, and was used for studying cometary, planetary, and extragalactic objects.  The LWS is now retired from science observations.
 NIRC  The Near Infrared Camera for the Keck I telescope is so sensitive it could detect the equivalent of a single candle flame on the Moon. This sensitivity makes it ideal for ultra-deep studies of galactic formation and evolution, the search for proto-galaxies and images of quasar environments. It has provided ground-breaking studies of the Galactic center, and is also used to study protoplanetary disks, and high-mass star-forming regions. NIRC was retired from science observations in 2010.
 NIRC-2  The second generation Near Infrared Camera works with the Keck Adaptive Optics system to produce the highest-resolution ground-based images and spectroscopy in the 1–5 micrometers (µm) range. Typical programs include mapping surface features on Solar System bodies, searching for planets around other stars, and analyzing the morphology of remote galaxies.
 NIRES  The Near-Infrared Echellette Spectrometer is a spectrograph that provides simultaneous coverage of wavelengths from 0.94 to 2.45 microns.
 NIRSPEC  The Near Infrared Spectrometer studies very high redshift radio galaxies, the motions and types of stars located near the Galactic Center, the nature of brown dwarfs, the nuclear regions of dusty starburst galaxies, active galactic nuclei, interstellar chemistry, stellar physics, and Solar System science.
 OSIRIS  The OH-Suppressing Infrared Imaging Spectrograph is a near-infrared spectrograph for use with the Keck I adaptive optics system. OSIRIS takes spectra in a small field of view to provide a series of images at different wavelengths. The instrument allows astronomers to ignore wavelengths where the Earth's atmosphere shines brightly due to emission from OH (hydroxyl) molecules, thus allowing the detection of objects 10 times fainter than previously available. Originally installed on Keck II, in January 2012 OSIRIS was moved to the Keck 1 telescope.
 Keck Interferometer  The Interferometer allowed the light from both Keck telescopes to be combined into an  baseline, near infrared, optical interferometer. This long baseline gave the interferometer an effective angular resolution of 5 milliarcseconds (mas) at 2.2 µm, and 24 mas at 10 µm. Several back-end instruments allowed the interferometer to operate in a variety of modes, operating in H, K, and L-band near infrared, as well as nulling interferometry. As of mid-2012 the Keck Interferometer has been discontinued for lack of funding.

Both Keck Observatory telescopes are equipped with laser guide star adaptive optics, which compensates for the blurring due to atmospheric turbulence. The first AO system operational on a large telescope, the equipment has been constantly upgraded to expand the capability.

See also 

 Extremely large telescope
 Gemini Observatory
 List of astronomical interferometers at visible and infrared wavelengths
 List of largest optical reflecting telescopes
 List of largest optical telescopes historically
 Mauna Kea Observatories
 Navigator Program
 Subaru Telescope
 Very Large Telescope

References

External links

 W. M. Keck Observatory (official site)
 Mauna Kea Observatories (official site)
 Keck Observatory Archive (KOA)
 Lawrence Berkeley Lab, Revolution in telescope design 
 Photos of Keck telescopes and other Mauna Kea observatories from "A Gentle Rain of Starlight: The Story of Astronomy on Mauna Kea" by Michael J. West. .

University of California
University of California, Santa Cruz
California Institute of Technology buildings and structures
Astronomy institutes and departments
Interferometric telescopes
Astronomical observatories in Hawaii
Buildings and structures in Hawaii County, Hawaii
Buildings and structures completed in 1993
Buildings and structures completed in 1996
1990 establishments in Hawaii